"Du hast den schönsten Arsch der Welt" is a German-language song by dance music producer and DJ Alex C. (Alex Christensen). It was recorded in cooperation with and featuring singer Y-ass. Also in 2007, Basshunter made a remix of the song titled "Du hast den schönsten Arsch der Welt (Bass My Ass Remix)". The song itself is a cover version of The Soundlovers' 1996 song "Run Away".

The song marked an international breakthrough for Alex Christensen. Due to the song receiving high ratings on several foreign dance charts, it was re-released in several other languages including in English as "Sweetest Ass in the World" as well as in French, Spanish, Dutch and Czech.

Awards and nominations 
Alex C. and Y-ass took part with the song in the 2008 Sopot Hit Festival music competition and were the overall runners-up with 29.7% of the votes in the category International Hit Summer 2008 losing to the eventual winner "Hey Hi Hello" by Shaun Baker feat. MaLoY (55.2%). The song was nominated for "Best Song of the Year" at the VIVA Comet Awards in 2008.

Recordings in other languages 
In some countries the melody and the lyrics were adjusted to fit the taste of the local inhabitants. The English and Spanish versions were recorded by Alex C and Y-ass, while other versions are covers by other artists. Some of these versions are:
 Alex C feat. Y-ass – "Sweetest Ass in the World" (English)
 Alex C feat. Y-ass – "Tienes el culo más bello del mundo" (Spanish)
 Mr. Vee & Michaela – "Máš nejhezčí zadek na světě" (Czech)
 Trasero – "Lekkerste kont van het land" (Dutch)
 Släm – Sul on kõige kaunim kann (Estonian)

Chart performance 
"Du hast den schönsten Arsch der Welt" is the only number-one hit for Alex C. as a solo act on the German Singles Chart, although he had a number-one hit in 1992 as part of U96 with the song "Das Boot". "Du hast den schönsten Arsch der Welt" stayed for one week at the top for the week of 16 November 2007. The song also topped the Austrian Top 40 for two weeks, on 16 and 23 November 2007.

Weekly charts

Year-end charts

Decade-end charts

Certifications

References 

2007 singles
2007 songs
German-language songs
Number-one singles in Austria
Number-one singles in Germany
Polydor Records singles
Universal Music Group singles